Live at Vega is a two-disc live album released  by Norwegian alternative rock group Kaizers Orchestra, on 6 March 2006. It features their recorded concert performance at Vega, a concert hall in Copenhagen, Denmark, on 6 October 2005. It was originally meant to be released alongside the DVD recording of the same concert, Viva La Vega, but the release of the DVD was delayed until later that year. The inside information reads:

Who would have thought that a rattling, rampaging, Norwegian singing orchestra would have the crowds go crazy at Vega in Copenhagen one October evening in 2005?  Probably the same people who would bet their whole record collection that thousands of Germans, Swiss and Spanish would one day holler along to songs in a language they did not understand, dance the "Ompa", and shout "Hallelujah" to six saviours in Swedish suits playing gypsy music from Norway.

Live at Vega is proof that anything is possible; that a spastic, foreign-sounding orchestra from tiny Norway can become one of the world’s greatest live bands.  The band that lives up to  own slogan: "Kontroll på Kontinentet", Rule the Continent, That band is Kaizers Orchestra.

The grand "Maestro Tour 05" saw Kaizers Orchestra playing 65 concerts throughout ten countries over a period of three months.  These CDs gives you the entire 30th concert, from one of the best concert venues in Europe.

Track listing
All songs are performed in the Norwegian language, with some English dialogue. Lyrics and music by Janove Ottesen, unless otherwise noted.

Disc one
"KGB"
"Delikatessen" (Delicatessen)
"Knekker deg til sist" (Break You in the End)
"Hevnervals" (Avenger's waltz)
"Container" (Dumpster) (Geir Zahl)
"Señor Flamingos adieu" (Instrumental)
"Blitzregn baby" (Blitz rain baby)
"Bøn fra helvete" (Prayer from Hell) (Ottesen/Zahl)
"Mann mot mann" (Man against Man)
"Kontroll på kontinentet" (Control over the Continent)
"Christiania" (Christiania)
"På ditt skift" (On Your Shift)
"Dr. Mowinckel" (Zahl)
"Di Grind" (Your Gate)
"Dieter Meyers Inst." (Dieter Meyer's Institution)

Disc two
 "Evig pint"  (Eternally Tormented)
 "Ompa til du dør" (Dance 'till you Die)
 "Maestro"
 "Mr. Kaizer, hans Constanze og meg" (Mr. Kaizer, his Constanze and I)
 "Sigøynerblod" (Gypsy Blood) (Ottesen/Zahl)
 "Bak et halleluja" (Behind a Hallelujah)
 "Resistansen" (The Resistance)
 "170"
 "Die Polizei" (The Police)

Kaizers Orchestra albums
2006 live albums